El Lencero Airport  is an airport located at Xalapa, Veracruz, Mexico. It handles national air traffic for the city of Xalapa. The airport is able to handle up to 100,000 passengers per year. Aeromar had for many years been the only commercial operator at the airport, with a total of 26–28 weekly flights to and from Mexico City. At the moment, El Lencero is not served by any commercial carrier.

Information 
Xalapa National Airport is located six miles east of Xalapa, on the South side of the road Xalapa – Veracruz, and Northwest of one small lagoon.

Four miles south of the airport is the hill Chavarrillo, which has 4,000 feet of elevation. The prevailing winds are from the E-SE throughout the year. Strong winds are from the North during the polar fronts season (October to May). There is often fog and low ceilings.

The only airport runway is 08–26 with 3,127 feet of elevation, paved, 1,780 meters long and 30 meters wide. To land on runway 08 it is necessary to execute a glide slope slightly steeper than normal, as the land rises to the west.

The AFIS UNICOM frequency is 123.3 MHz and is open to all operations from dawn to dusk.

In 2013 the airport began a renovation and expansion that includes the construction of a new runway.

In 2016, Xalapa received 3,708 passengers, while in 2017 were 760 passengers, according to data released by the Direction General of Civil Aeronautics.

Accidents and incidents
 On 21 February 2021, a Learjet 45XR operated by the Mexican Air Force crashed while taking off from El Lencero Airport, killing all six people on board.

See also 

List of the busiest airports in Mexico

References

External links
 MMJA at Fallingrain.
 MMJA at Elite Jets.
 MMJA photo at Our Airports.

Airports in Veracruz
Xalapa